The Tree in a Test Tube (1942) is a short film produced by the U. S. Department of Agriculture and distributed by the U.S. Forest Service, featuring Laurel and Hardy, with narration read by MGM announcer and producer Pete Smith.

Plot outline
To Pete Smith's voice over commentary, Stan and Ollie, seemingly picked at random in the street and professing not to have any wood in their possession at the time,  produce various props — the contents of a suitcase and their wallets — all manufactured from wood or containing wood byproducts. (At one point Ollie even indicates that Stan's head is made of wood, to Stan's annoyance.) The props demonstrate the omnipresence of wood products in the American economy, including paper, cellulose-based artificial leather, rayon, witch hazel, and bioplastics in consumer items (this was in the early days of mass-produced plastic, before petrochemical plastics became widespread).

Production background
The Tree in a Test Tube is Laurel and Hardy's only known surviving professionally shot color film, shot in Kodachrome on 16mm. The Rogue Song (1930), made in Technicolor and featuring the duo in their only other known professional color footage, is now considered a lost film, although a number of fragments have survived; some home movies of the two in the 1950s also exist in color.

Their routine lasts around five minutes and was shot silent; Laurel does not audibly speak, but Hardy makes two utterances (laughter and an utterance of "Ain't that the truth!") that were dubbed into Smith's audio track. The second half of the film is unrelated documentary film footage, which shifts focus toward wood's importance to the World War II victory effort. Included in the documentary footage are visits to a research laboratory in Madison, Wisconsin and a demonstration at the Ringling Bros. and Barnum & Bailey Circus in which an elephant stands on a piece of laminated veneer lumber without breaking it.

Laurel and Hardy shot this brief film during their lunch hour on the back lot of Twentieth Century-Fox on November 29, 1941, while they were filming Jitterbugs, and the film went into release in spring of 1942.

References

External links
 
 
 
 

1942 films
1942 comedy films
American World War II propaganda shorts
Articles containing video clips
1942 short films
American comedy short films
1940s English-language films
1940s American films